Eresus lavrosiae is a spider species found in Georgia.

See also 
 List of Eresidae species

References

External links 

Eresidae
Spiders of Europe
Spiders of Georgia (country)
Spiders described in 1997